Damascus (April 14, 1964 – August 8, 1995) was a champion American Thoroughbred racehorse who was the 1967 Horse of the Year after winning the Preakness Stakes, Belmont Stakes, Travers Stakes, Jockey Club Gold Cup, Woodward Stakes, and Dwyer Stakes. Damascus also came third in the Kentucky Derby that year.

In a race many consider the "Race of the Century," Damascus won the 1967 Woodward by 10 lengths over both Dr. Fager and Buckpasser after his connections, as well as those of Buckpasser, used stablemates to set a blistering pace that weakened Dr. Fager who never was able to rate. In Blood-Horse magazine List of the Top 100 Racehorses of the 20th Century, Dr. Fager is ranked 6th and Buckpasser is ranked 14th, while Damascus is ranked 16th.

In the Dwyer Stakes, Damascus closed from 12 lengths back and carried 16 pounds more than the second placed horse.

Background
Damascus was sired by Sword Dancer (1959's Horse of the Year) out of Kerala (by My Babu) foaled at the Jonabell Farm in Lexington, Kentucky. He was owned and bred by Edith Woodward Bancroft, whose father, William Woodward Sr., owned Belair Stud and won five Belmonts in the 1930s. Edith Bancroft inherited the famed Belair white silks with red polka dots and scarlet cap but  never used Belair as a stable name. Damascus was trained by Hall of Famer Frank Whiteley Jr. and ridden by Hall of Fame jockey Bill Shoemaker.

Racing career
A high-strung horse, Damascus was enervated by the humidity and spooked by the crowd noise in the Kentucky Derby, so he was thereafter given a stable pony to calm him.

Damascus won the Travers Stakes by 22 lengths, the Remsen Stakes, the American Derby while setting a track record, the Aqueduct Handicap against older horses and carrying top weight, the Leonard Richards Stakes, the Bay Shore Stakes, the Brooklyn Handicap (beating Dr. Fager, who had beaten him in the Suburban Handicap two weeks earlier), the William Dupont Jr. Handicap, the San Fernando Breeders' Cup Stakes, and the Malibu Stakes.

He bowed a tendon while racing in his second Jockey Club Gold Cup, coming in last, which was the only time in his career he was out of the top three.  Whiteley then retired him to stud.

In his three-year-old season, Damascus set an earnings record for a single season ($817,941) that held until Secretariat surpassed it almost a decade later.

Out of 32 lifetime starts, Damascus won 21 times, placed seven times, and came home third three times.  His career earnings amounted to $1,176,781. He was inducted into the National Museum of Racing and Hall of Fame in 1974.

Stud record
At stud at Arthur B. Hancock Jr.'s Claiborne Farm near Paris, Kentucky, Damascus sired 71 stakes winners before being pensioned in 1989.  He was especially successful with his daughters who produced champions.  He died in his paddock at the age of 31 on August 8, 1995, and was buried at Claiborne.

Breeding

Notes

 Races normally held at Belmont Park, but in the years Damascus raced were held at Aqueduct, are designated by *.

References

Damascus in the Hall of Fame, including a video of his Belmont win
America's Championship three-year-old males
Whiteley in the Hall of Fame
Damascus at stud
 Frank Whiteley and Damascus, 1967

1964 racehorse births
1995 racehorse deaths
Racehorses trained in the United States
Racehorses bred in Kentucky
American Thoroughbred Horse of the Year
Eclipse Award winners
United States Thoroughbred Racing Hall of Fame inductees
Belmont Stakes winners
Preakness Stakes winners
United States Champion Thoroughbred Sires
Thoroughbred family 8-h
Chefs-de-Race